Giorgio Galimberti (born 5 September 1976) is a former Italian professional tennis player.

Born in Milan, Galimberti turned professional in 1995. His career-high rankings were World No. 115 (May 2003) in singles and No. 65 (June 2005) in doubles.

Tennis career
As a junior, Galimberti reached the final of the 1994 French Open, losing to Jacobo Díaz. En route, he defeated future top pros Stefan Koubek, Gustavo Kuerten, Mariano Zabaleta and Nicolas Lapentti. On the pro tour, Galimberti played singles mostly at Challenger level, while in doubles he won the 2005 ATP title in Milan, teaming with Daniele Bracciali, and reached two other ATP finals.

On February 18, 2008, Galimberti was suspended for 100 days and fined $35,000 (£17,808) after being found guilty of betting on tennis games between June 2003 to January 2006. It is not known whether Galimberti had bet on his own matches. Investigations into Galimberti's activities took place in August 2007, and were reviewed by an "independent anti-corruption hearing officer". Galimberti was the fourth Italian tennis player to be suspended after betting on other player's matches.

Performance Timeline

Singles

ATP career finals

Doubles: 3 (1 title, 2 runner-ups)

ATP Challenger and ITF Futures finals

Singles: 12 (5–7)

Doubles: 39 (28–11)

Junior Grand Slam Finals

Singles: 1 (1 runner-up)

References

External links
 
 
 

1976 births
Living people
Italian male tennis players
Tennis players from Milan
Sportspeople involved in betting scandals